Tephritites is a genus of tephritid  or fruit flies in the family Tephritidae.  It may be a synonym of Hyalotephritis.

References

Tephritinae